Ryu Jae-moon (born 8 November 1993) is a South Korean footballer who plays as a midfielder for Jeonbuk Hyundai Motors.

Career
Born on 8 November 1993, Ryu signed with Daegu FC prior to the start of the 2015 season.

On 11 January 2021, Ryu signed with Jeonbuk Hyundai Motors on a three-year deal.

Club career statistics

References

External links 

1993 births
Living people
Association football midfielders
South Korean footballers
Daegu FC players
Jeonbuk Hyundai Motors players
K League 1 players
K League 2 players